Sausa District is one of thirty-four districts of the province of Jauja (Quechua: Shawsha or Sausa) in Peru.

References